The Spellbinder is the name of four fictional characters that appear as supervillains in comic books published by DC Comics. Versions of the character have appeared on the animated series Batman Beyond and The Batman.

Fictional character biography

Delbert Billings

Spellbinder (Delbert Billings) first appeared in Detective Comics #358 (December 1966), and was created by John Broome and Sheldon Moldoff. He was a painter who used optical illusions and hypnotic weapons to commit crimes.

Delbert was a forger of pop art who decided to put his talents to use as a supervillain. He created the Spellbinder identity, designed hypnotic weapons, and assembled a team of henchmen. He ran into Batman during his first robbery, but hypnotized the crimefighter into believing he was involved in an entirely different situation, as his gang made their getaway. This ploy worked twice, but on his third robbery, Batman was able to overcome it and send him to jail.

After leaving prison, the Spellbinder faced off with Superman in Superman #330 (1978). Using a miniature turntable, he was able to create sonic blasts that would make targets more susceptible to his hypnotic suggestions. The addition of a shock absorbing chin-guard to his helmet protected him from being knocked out by Superman, and special lenses protected him from hypnosis by the Man of Steel. He was finally defeated when his own sonic blasts were echoed back on him (rendering him unconscious). This issue also revealed how Superman uses sub-conscious hypnosis (heightened by the Kryptonian lenses in his glasses) to successfully disguise himself as Clark Kent.

The Spellbinder joined a loosely knit conglomerate of crime organized by the Monarch of Menace. He was the first member of the group to be captured by Batman, who later disguised himself as the Spellbinder to infiltrate the group and capture the Monarch.

Later, the Spellbinder was on the run from the law with his new girlfriend, Fay Moffit, when he was confronted by the demon-lord Neron. Neron offered a deal of immense power in exchange for the Spellbinder's soul, but he rejected it. Fay, however, thought it sounded like a great idea, so she killed the Spellbinder by shooting him in the head and took the deal for herself. Neron was not surprised and explained that he had never actually been addressing the Spellbinder with the deal; he had been addressing her all along.

Real name unknown
A second Spellbinder (real name unknown) appeared in Justice League International (vol. 2) #65 (June 1994) as a member of the government-sanctioned "League-Busters".

Fay Moffit
During the Underworld Unleashed crossover event, Delbert Billings (the original Spellbinder) rejected Neron's deal of immense power in exchange for his soul and was shot in the head and killed by his girlfriend, Fay Moffit, who then took the deal for herself and became the third Spellbinder (also known as Lady Spellbinder) as a result.

Neron granted her the ability to induce genuine hallucinations. She was followed by Batman and Robin, but they did not know the scale of her illusion-casting abilities, which extended to making absolutely everything disappear. She escaped from the heroes due to her ability to create a total illusion in her immediate vicinity, which remained even if they closed their eyes. They realized that the only way to be able to approach her safely is if the approach is controlled by someone outside her immediate area of influence. Robin acts as Batman's eyes once the Spellbinder is tracked down by the police, guiding him using a version of virtual reality technology. Once captured, the Spellbinder discovers that her deal with Neron was not all she had hoped — if her eyes are covered or closed, her illusion-casting abilities no longer function.

She subsequently appeared in Birds of Prey, where she created an illusory world in which Barbara Gordon was Batgirl (although she did not realize this had once been true). She had been hired by the Blockbuster to kidnap Barbara. Barbara was able to defeat the Spellbinder when she attacked Moffit with a fire extinguisher (to blind her and prevent her from casting illusions) and a club, and then tied her up and left her for the police.

The Spellbinder returned to Birds of Prey when the Black Canary and the Catwoman were kidnapped by the rogue Parademon Pharzoof. She was being transported with several other villains when their train was hijacked and taken to Apokolips. The villains battled the Parademons and eventually were returned to Earth, where they were taken to the Slab.

The Spellbinder returned again in the miniseries Joker: Last Laugh. In Birds of Prey #36, she battles the Black Canary, who is trapped inside Slabside Penitentiary along with a host of villains infected by the Joker's Joker venom, making them even more crazed than ever. The Black Canary's sonic cry is able to give most of them pause, but the Joker sends the Copperhead and the Hellgrammite after her, as neither one of them have ears. After dealing with them, she is briefly confronted by the Shadow Thief before meeting, to her great relief, the Batman, Superman, and Mary Marvel. However, the Black Canary soon notices that Marvel's lightning bolt is backwards, and the heroes are revealed to be an illusion created by the Spellbinder, who was the first of the female villains infected by the Joker's Joker venom.

The Spellbinder was apparently killed alongside the Trigger Twins by a group of gun-toting superheroes during Infinite Crisis. It is noted that she bears a striking resemblance (both physically and in terms of powers) to the mysterious fourth Harlequin. Although very similar in appearance, they are two separate characters.

The New 52
A fourth Spellbinder appears in The New 52 under the name of Viktor Mironov. Mironov, as the Spellbinder, was a Russian magician known for his ability to use magic to attack a person's psyche. When John Constantine contacted him to recruit him in a plan to fight the Cult of the Cold Flame, the Spellbinder initially reacted by attacking Constantine and rummaging through his mind. When the Spellbinder discovered that Constantine was sincerer, he agreed to the plan.

However, a spell gone wrong by Papa Midnite sent the entire plan into a shambles. Constantine was sent to the wrong time period to fight the Cult and, not knowing their leader was not there to guide them, the Spellbinder and another mage were killed fighting the Cold Flame.

Infinite Frontier
During Infinite Frontier and after Fear State, a classmate of Barbara Gordon named Charles Dante became Spellbinder.

Powers and abilities
The original Spellbinder used a number of optical and aural devices of his own invention to hypnotize others. His fighting skills were minimal.

The second unnamed Spellbinder had genuine mystical abilities. 

The third Spellbinder, also known as Lady Spellbinder, can create terrifying realistic illusions and the recipients can feel the actual pain of the illusions. If she is blinded or has her eyes closed or covered, she is unable to cast the illusions.

In other media

Television

 A futuristic incarnation of Spellbinder appears in Batman Beyond, voiced by Jon Cypher. This version is Dr. Ira Billings, the school psychologist of Hamilton High who wears a suit featuring an orange-and-black swirl design and uses a large floating "eyeball" that allows him to project images into the minds of others via hypnosis and virtual technology. In the episode "Spellbound", having become dissatisfied with working with students, whom he sees as spoiled brats, he goes on a crime spree by tricking his students into stealing valuable items for him and disguising it as them performing acts based on their fantasies until he is defeated by Batman. In the episode "Hooked Up", Billings creates the addictive VR Rooms, which creates the user's greatest fantasy and eventually renders them catatonic the more they use it. He fights Batman when the latter tracks him to his lair, but is defeated by Batman's ally, Max Gibson. In the episode "Eyewitness", Billings kidnaps a terrorist called Mad Stan and traps him in a VR Room before creating the illusion that Batman killed Mad Stan and hindering Batman's efforts to clear his name. However, Batman and Commissioner Gordon eventually track and defeat Billings.
 The unnamed incarnation of Spellbinder appears in The Batman, voiced by Michael Massee. This version has a third eye, which he acquired while meditating in the Far East and gives him the ability to induce hallucinations in others. In the episode "The Butler Did It", he poses as a photographer conducting photo shoots for a charity event to beam hypnotic commands into the minds of Bruce Wayne, two of the latter's colleagues, and their butlers. Despite Batman's interference, Spellbinder tasks the butlers with stealing from their employers to distract from him stealing a rare gemstone capable of enhancing his third eye's powers and make his illusions more realistic. After acquiring the gemstone, Spellbinder nearly discovers Batman and Wayne are the same person after the Dark Knight responds to a command meant for Wayne, but Alfred Pennyworth intervenes, causing Spellbinder to believe Batman pretended to fall under his control to make him lower his guard. Despite Spellbinder's efforts, Batman utilizes his strength of mind training to overcome the former's powers and defeat him. Spellbinder also makes a minor appearance in the episode "Rumors" as a prisoner of the titular vigilante.

Miscellaneous
Spellbinder makes a cameo appearance in Wayne of Gotham, by Tracy Hickman.

See also
 List of Batman family enemies

References

External links
Cosmic Team profile

The Batman profile at World's Finest Online

Characters created by John Broome
Characters created by Chuck Dixon
Characters created by Sheldon Moldoff
Comics characters introduced in 1966
Comics characters introduced in 1994
Comics characters introduced in 1995
Fictional Russian people
DC Comics characters who use magic
DC Comics female supervillains
DC Comics metahumans
Fictional artists
Fictional hypnotists and indoctrinators
Fictional murderers
Fictional psychologists